Pyrausta interfixalis is a moth in the family Crambidae. It was described by Francis Walker in 1869. It is found in the Democratic Republic of the Congo.

References

Moths described in 1869
interfixalis
Moths of Africa
Endemic fauna of the Democratic Republic of the Congo